Ermocrate Bucchi (1842 – 1885) was an Italian painter, mainly of still lifes with flowers.

Biography
He was born in Urbino and died in Milan. As a youth, he worked as a grocer, and even began a career to become a priest.  He then took studies at the Brera Academy, but to make a living, he worked on engraving on ivory. He became a pupil of the watercolor artist Luigi Scrosati, who trained him in a painting of flowers. This sufficed to give his a successful career. The critic Virgilio Colombo in presenting the best artists who exhibited at the 1881 Art Show of Milan, said of Bucchi's paintings, that he sent his best watercolors of flowers to Holland; where the prominent art dealer Adolphe Goupil, of the Goupil Gallery, grouped them with Dutch flower painters, bringing much success to Bucchi. At this Exhibition, Bucchi displayed the two paintings: The seller of flowers and still life.

References

1842 births
1885 deaths
People from Urbino
19th-century Italian painters
Italian male painters
Painters from Milan
Italian still life painters
Brera Academy alumni
19th-century Italian male artists